CCAM may refer to:
Certified Community Association Manager

Congenital cystic adenomatoid malformation, now known as congenital pulmonary airway malformation (CPAM)
cCam, a camera capture program that runs on Nokia S60 phones
Center for research on Children, Adolescents, and the Media at the University of Amsterdam, the Netherlands
Commonwealth Center for Advanced Manufacturing, a university-corporate collaborative research institution in Prince George County, Virginia
Cooperative Connected and Automated Mobility, a branch of intelligent transportation systems